George Washington Vanderbilt may refer to:

 George Washington Vanderbilt II (1862–1914), American art collector
 George Washington Vanderbilt III (1914–1961), American yachtsman and scientific explorer

See also
Vanderbilt family